Kuy-e Lotf (also Romanized as Kūy-e Loţf; also known as Kūh-e Loţf and Kūh Loţf) is a village in Eshen Rural District, Mehrdasht District, Najafabad County, Isfahan Province, Iran. At the 2006 census, its population was 14, in 6 families.

References 

Populated places in Najafabad County